The N–15 or National Highway 15 is a 240-kilometre-long national highway in Pakistan. It connects the city of Mansehra in Pakistan's Khyber Pakhtunkhwa province to the city of Chilas in the administrative territory of Gilgit–Baltistan. It is often used as a bypass for the Karakoram Highway (N–35) and is popular amongst tourists who visit Naran and its surrounding region.

See also 
 Karakoram Highway
 Naran Valley
 Gilgit–Baltistan
 Transportation in Pakistan
 National Highways of Pakistan

References

External links 
 National Highway Authority

Roads in Pakistan